Maid in Sweden is a 1971 American and Swedish drama film directed by Dan Wolman. This film starring Christina Lindberg, Monica Ekman, Krister Ekman, Leif Naeslund, Per-Axel Arosenius in the lead roles. The film music composed by Bob Nash.

Cast
 Christina Lindberg - Inga (as Kristina Lindberg)
 Monica Ekman - Greta 
 Krister Ekman - Casten 
 Leif Naeslund - Bjorn (as Leif Näslun) 
 Per-Axel Arosenius - Father (as Per Axel Arosenius) 
 Ittla Frodi - Mother (as Itela Frodi)
 Tina Hedström - Helen 
 Henrik Meyer - Ole 
 Wivian Öiangen - Brita (as Vivianne Öjengen)

References

External links
 
 

1971 films
1971 drama films
English-language Swedish films
American drama films
Swedish drama films
1970s English-language films
1970s American films
1970s Swedish films